Rick Barot (born February 19, 1969) is an American poet and educator.

Life 
Barot was born in the Philippines, grew up in the San Francisco Bay Area, and attended Wesleyan University and The Writers’ Workshop at the University of Iowa.

He has published three books of poetry with Sarabande Books: The Darker Fall (2002), which received the Kathryn A. Morton Prize; Want (2008), which was a finalist for the Lambda Literary Award and won the 2009 Grub Street Book Prize; and Chord (2015), which was a finalist for the LA Times Book Prize and received the 2016 UNT Rilke Prize, the PEN Open Book Award, and the Publishing Triangle's Thom Gunn Award. He has received fellowships from the Guggenheim Foundation, the National Endowment for the Arts, the Artist Trust of Washington, the Civitella Ranieri Foundation, and Stanford University, where he was a Wallace E. Stegner Fellow and a Jones Lecturer in Poetry.

Barot is the poetry editor of New England Review. He lives in Tacoma, Washington, and teaches at Pacific Lutheran University. He is also the director of the Rainier Writing Workshop, the low-residency MFA in creative writing at PLU. He previously taught at the low-residency MFA at Warren Wilson College. His fourth book of poems, The Galleons, was published by Milkweed Editions in 2020.

References

External links
Profile: Poet and Incoming RWW Director, Rick Barot

21st-century American poets
American male poets
Living people
American poets of Asian descent
American writers of Filipino descent
1969 births
21st-century American male writers